Gwanghwamun Station is a station on the Seoul Subway Line 5 in South Korea. It is not the closest subway station to the actual gate of Gwanghwamun, which it is named after. It is located next to the U.S. Embassy in Seoul.

This station boasts the most traffic of all Line 5 stations.

Station layout

Vicinity

 Exit 1: Sejong Center for the Performing Arts
 Exit 2: Embassy of the United States, Seoul, Ministry of Culture and Tourism, Jongno District Office
 Exit 3: New Zealand Embassy of Korea
 Exit 4: Kyobo Building, Kyobo Book Centre and Embassy of Colombia in Seoul
 Exit 5: Cheonggyecheon and Kyobo Book Centre
 Exit 6: Taiwan Embassy of Korea, Deoksu Elementary School
 Exit 9: Haechi Madang, an underground walkway that connects the station to Gwanghwamun Plaza

Tourism
In January 2013, the Seoul Metropolitan Rapid Transit Corporation, which operates the line, distributed free guidebooks from the station. These were printed in three languages: English, Japanese and Chinese (simplified and traditional), which features eight tours as well as recommendations for accommodations, restaurants and shopping centers.

Nearby tourist attractions include: Gyeongbokgung Palace, Cheonggyecheon and Kyobo Book Centre.

References

Metro stations in Jongno District
Seoul Metropolitan Subway stations
Railway stations opened in 1996